The 1931 European Wrestling Championships were held in  the men's Freestyle style  in Budapest 9 - 11 October 1931; the Greco-Romane style and  in Prague 27 - 29 March 1931.

Medal table

Medal summary

Men's freestyle

Men's Greco-Roman

References

External links
FILA Database

1931 in European sport
Sports competitions in Czechoslovakia
Sports competitions in Hungary